Micromygale is a genus of spiders in the family Microstigmatidae containing the sole species Micromygale diblemma. The species was described in 1982 by Platnick and Forster and is found in Panama.

References

Mygalomorphae genera
Monotypic Mygalomorphae genera
Spiders of Central America